Portland most commonly refers to:
 Portland, Oregon, the largest city in the U.S. state of Oregon
 Portland, Maine, the largest city in the U.S. state of Maine
 Isle of Portland, a tied island in the English Channel

Portland may also refer to:

Places and establishments

Australia
Cape Portland, Tasmania, a cape on the north-eastern tip of Tasmania
Portland, New South Wales, a town with the first Australian cement works
Portland, Victoria, a regional city and port
City of Portland (Victoria), a former local government area (LGA)

Canada
Port Lands, Toronto, Ontario (sometimes mistakenly spelled "Portlands"), the eastern part of the Toronto waterfront
Portland Island (British Columbia), a small island off the coast of Vancouver island
Portland Inlet, an inlet between southeastern Alaska and British Columbia
Portland Canal, an arm of Portland Inlet
Portland Estates, Nova Scotia, an area of Halifax
Portland, Ontario, a town north of Kingston, Ontario
Portland, Newfoundland and Labrador, a village on the east coast of Newfoundland

Hong Kong
Portland Street, a popular business and shopping street in Hong Kong

Ireland
Portland, County Tipperary, a townland in North Tipperary

Jamaica
Portland Parish, on Jamaica's north-east coast
Portland Point, Jamaica's southernmost point

New Zealand
Portland, New Zealand, a town south of Whangarei
Portland Island (New Zealand), an island off the Mahia Peninsula

South Africa 

 Portland, Mitchells Plain, a neighborhood of Cape Town

United Kingdom
Portland, Somerset, a location
Isle of Portland, a peninsula on the coast of Dorset, the origin of the name
Portland Bill, the headland at the tip of the Isle of Portland
Portland Harbour, a large man-made harbour between the Isle of Portland and the mainland
Weymouth and Portland, a local government district of Dorset, including the Isle of Portland
HM Prison Portland, a prison for male young offenders on the Isle of Portland
Portland College, an education establishment in the county of Nottinghamshire
Portland Gallery, an art gallery in Westminster, London
Portland House, a building in Westminster, London
Portland Place, a street in the Marylebone district of central London
Portland Square, Bristol, a Georgian square in the city of Bristol
Manchester One, formerly known as Portland Tower, a tower block in Manchester
Portland Walk Shopping Centre, a shopping centre in Barrow-in-Furness
Great Portland Street, a street in the West End of London

United States

Portland City, Alaska was founded in 1907 but renamed in 1915 to Hyder, Alaska
Portland, Arkansas
Portland, Fremont County, Colorado
Portland, Colorado in Ouray County
Portland, Connecticut, a New England town
Portland (CDP), Connecticut, the urban portion of the town
Portland, Georgia
Portland, Illinois (disambiguation), a former name of two places
Portland, Indiana, a city in Jay County near the eastern border of the state
Portland, a former name for Fountain, Indiana, in Fountain County near the western border of the state
Portland Township, Cerro Gordo County, Iowa
Portland, Iowa, census-designated place in Portland Township
Portland, Kansas
Portland, Kentucky, a community in Adair County
Portland, Louisville, Kentucky, a former town and now a neighborhood in Louisville, Kentucky
Portland, Maine, the largest city in Maine
South Portland, Maine, adjoining Portland, Maine
New Portland, Maine (not near Portland, Maine)
Portland, Michigan
Portland, Missouri
Portland, New York
Portland, North Dakota
Portland, Ohio
Portland, Oregon, the largest city in the world named Portland
Portland, Pennsylvania
Portland, Tennessee
Portland, Texas
Portland, Dodge County, Wisconsin, a town
Portland (community), Dodge County, Wisconsin, an unincorporated community
Portland, Monroe County, Wisconsin, a town
Portland (community), Monroe County, Wisconsin, an unincorporated community

Transport
City of Portland (train), a passenger train running between Chicago, Illinois, and Portland, Oregon
Duke of Portland (whaler), an American whaling ship
, any of eight ships of the British Navy
Portland (shipwreck), a ship sunk in the Portland Gale off New England in 1898
Portland (sidewheeler 1853)
Portland (1875 tugboat)
Portland (1947 tugboat), a preserved sternwheel tugboat based in Portland, Oregon
, any of three United States Navy ships

Sports teams

Based in Portland, Oregon
Portland Beavers, a former PCL minor league baseball team
Portland Mavericks, a former NWL minor league baseball team and current independent team based in Keizer, Oregon
Portland Pickles, a collegiate baseball team 
Portland Pilots, the intercollegiate athletic program of the University of Portland
Portland State Vikings, the intercollegiate athletic program of Portland State University
Portland Thorns FC, an American professional women's soccer club since 2013; operated by the current Portland Timbers (below)
Portland Timbers (disambiguation), several different soccer teams, including these:
Portland Timbers, an American professional soccer club since 2011
Portland Timbers 2, reserve side for the current Portland Timbers since 2015
Portland Trail Blazers, an NBA basketball team
Portland Winterhawks, a WHL hockey team

Based in Portland, Maine
Portland Pirates, a former AHL minor league hockey team
Portland Sea Dogs, an EL minor league baseball team

Based elsewhere
SDC San Antonio, formerly known as Portland San Antonio, a Spanish ASOBAL handball team based in Pamplona, Spain

Other uses
"Portland" (song), a 2017 single from Canadian rapper Drake's album More Life
"Portland Oregon" (song), a 2004 single by  Loretta Lynn and Jack White
Battle of Portland, a sea battle off the Isle of Portland in 1653 during the First Anglo-Dutch War
Battle of Portland Harbor, a naval battle near Portland, Maine in 1863 during the American Civil War
Portland (film), a 1996 Danish film
Portland, a fictional area, based on Brooklyn, Queens, and Long Island, in the 2001 video game Grand Theft Auto III
Portland cement, the type of cement used for most mortar and concrete
Portland Club (London), a club in London, the recognized authority on the games of whist and bridge
Portland Club (Portland, Maine), a club in Portland, Maine
Portland Communications, a British political consultancy and public relations agency
Portland Flats, an apartment building in Washington, D.C.
Portland Formation, a geological formation in the northeastern United States
Portland Gale, a storm off New England in 1898
Portland Hoffa, an American comedian
Portland Orange, a color of light emitted by the don't walk phase of pedestrian crossing signals in North America
Portland Project, an initiative to encourage the use of Linux on desktop computers
Portland sheep, an ancient breed of sheep from the Isle of Portland
Portland Spurge (Euphorbia portlandica), a plant belonging to the family Euphorbiaceae
Portland stone, limestone from the Isle of Portland
Portland Vase, a Roman antique exhibited at the British Galleries

See also
The Adventures of Portland Bill
Earl of Portland (also Duke of Portland), an English title
Portlandia (disambiguation)
Portland Museum (disambiguation)
Portland Township (disambiguation)